An incomplete series of events, births and deaths which happened in Italy in 1610:

 10 April – Treaty of Brussol

Births 
 Ercole Ferrata (dies 1686)
 Stefano della Bella, draughtsman and printmaker (dies 1664)
 Giovanni Francesco
 Anton Francesco Lucini
 Pietro del Po,  Baroque painter (dies 1692)
 Francesco Lauri,  Baroque painter (dies 1635)
 Domenico de Benedettis, painter (dies 1678)
 Adriano Palladino, painter (dies 1680)
 Eustachio Divini (dies 1685)
 Giulio Quaglio (painter) (dies 1658 or later)

Deaths 
 Caravaggio
 Paolo Virchi
 Francesco Vanni
 Francesco Curia
 Ascanio Vitozzi
 Giovanni Battista Cremonini

References